William or Bill Fitch may refer to:
William Stevenson Fitch (1793–1859), English antiquarian
William Fitch (British Army officer) (died 1795), British soldier
William Edward Fitch (1867–1949), American physician, surgeon and writer
William H. Fitch (1929–2016), United States Marine Corps general
W. Tecumseh Fitch (William Tecumseh Sherman Fitch III, born 1963), American evolutionary biologist and cognitive scientist
Bill Fitch (1932–2022), American NBA coach
Bill Fitch (baseball), American baseball player
Benet Canfield (born William Benedict Fytch, 1562–1610), English mystic
Clyde Fitch (William Clyde Fitch, 1865–1909), American dramatist

See also
 William Fish (disambiguation)